Maysa Zaid Mahmoud Jbarah (born 20 September 1989) is a Jordanian footballer who plays as a forward for Turkish club Ankara BB Fomget and the Jordan national team. She is her country's top goalscorer.

Club career 
Jbarah began her career with Amman in 2000, before moving to Lebanese Women's Football League side Sadaka in 2007, remaining until 2010. In 2016 she moved to Abu Dhabi Ladies Club, staying one year, when she returned to Lebanon, signing for Zouk Mosbeh.

In 2018 Jbarah moved to France, at Grenoble for one season, and then joined  in 2019. By August 2021, she signed with Ankara BB Fomget to play in the Turkish Super League. She opened the 2021–22 league season scoring her team's first goal in the home match. She netted 16 goals in 20 league matches at the 2021-22 season.

International career 
Jbarah scored her first goal for the Jordan national team at the 2010 Asian Games in a 10–1 defeat to hosts China. She also scored Jordan's first goal at the AFC Women's Asian Cup in the 2014 edition in a 3–1 defeat to hosts Vietnam.

Career statistics

International 
Scores and results list Jordan's goal tally first.

See also 
 List of top international women's football goal scorers by country

References

External links 
 Maysa Jbarah at the Turkish Football Federation
 
 Maysa Jbarah at Footofeminin.fr
 

1989 births
Living people
Sportspeople from Kuwait City
Jordanian women's footballers
Jordanian women's futsal players
Women's association football forwards
Jordan women's international footballers
Sadaka SC women's footballers
Zouk Mosbeh SC footballers
Jordan Women's Football League players
Lebanese Women's Football League players
Asian Games competitors for Jordan
Footballers at the 2010 Asian Games
Footballers at the 2014 Asian Games
Jordanian expatriate footballers
Jordanian expatriate sportspeople in Lebanon
Jordanian expatriate sportspeople in the United Arab Emirates
Jordanian expatriate sportspeople in France
Expatriate women's footballers in Lebanon
Expatriate women's footballers in the United Arab Emirates
Expatriate women's footballers in France
Grenoble Foot 38 (women) players
Jordanian expatriate sportspeople in Turkey
Expatriate women's footballers in Turkey
Turkish Women's Football Super League players
Fomget Gençlik ve Spor players
FIFA Century Club
Saudi Women's Premier League players